In Greek mythology, the name Leuconoe (Ancient Greek: Λευκονόη) may refer to:

Leuconoe, one of the Minyads, more commonly known as Leucippe.
Leuconoe, daughter of Lucifer (Eosphorus) and mother of Philammon by Apollo. In some accounts, the mother of Philammon was called Chione or Philonis.
In some editions of Hyginus' Fabulae, Leuconoe was the suggested reading for the name of the child of Poseidon and Themisto. The reading Leucon has been accepted as more appropriate.

In Roman literature, Leuconoe is a figure to whom Horace's Ode 11 of Book 1 of Odes is addressed.

Notes

References 

Gaius Julius Hyginus, Fabulae from The Myths of Hyginus translated and edited by Mary Grant. University of Kansas Publications in Humanistic Studies. Online version at the Topos Text Project.
 Hesiod, Catalogue of Women from Homeric Hymns, Epic Cycle, Homerica translated by Evelyn-White, H G. Loeb Classical Library Volume 57. London: William Heinemann, 1914. Online version at theio.com

 Publius Ovidius Naso, Metamorphoses translated by Brookes More (1859-1942). Boston, Cornhill Publishing Co. 1922. Online version at the Perseus Digital Library.
 Publius Ovidius Naso, Metamorphoses. Hugo Magnus. Gotha (Germany). Friedr. Andr. Perthes. 1892. Latin text available at the Perseus Digital Library.

Princesses in Greek mythology
Women of Apollo
Phocian characters in Greek mythology